The 2010–11 Virginia Tech Hokies men's basketball team represented Virginia Polytechnic Institute and State University during the 2010–11 NCAA Division I men's basketball season. The Hokies, led by eighth year head coach Seth Greenberg, played their home games at Cassell Coliseum and are members of the Atlantic Coast Conference. They finished the season 22–12, 9–7 in ACC play and lost in the semifinals of the 2011 ACC men's basketball tournament to Duke. They were invited to the 2011 National Invitation Tournament where they defeated Bethune–Cookman in the first round before falling to Wichita State in the second round.

Roster

Schedule

|-
!colspan=9| Regular season

|-
!colspan=9| ACC tournament

|-
!colspan=9| NIT tournament

References

Virginia Tech
Virginia Tech Hokies men's basketball seasons
Virginia Tech
Virginia Tech
Virginia Tech